Nevine or Nevin Gamea was the Minister of Industry and Trade of Egypt. She came to the cabinet in December 2019. She is the first female minister to have this post since June 30, 2013. During an interview, when asked, how is her ministry supporting the businesses because of COVID-19, she said

"Since the onset of the COVID-19 crisis, MSMEDA has provided support for all its sponsored enterprises, particularly those that are negatively affected. The authority launched many initiatives to mitigate the effects of the crisis on MSMEs, including suspending or extending instalment repayment of the aggrieved enterprises. MSMEDA has also smoothed out application and establishment procedures for manufacturing detergents and medical activities amid the crisis."

Early life and education 
Gamea studied at the Faculty of Commerce at Cairo University. She has also worked in the National Bank of Kuwait and the National Bank of Development (NBD).

Previous positions held 

 Secretary-General of the Social Fund for Development (SFD), 2016
 CEO of the Small, Medium and Micro Enterprise Development Agency, 2017

References 

Year of birth missing (living people)
Living people
Trade and Industry ministers of Egypt
Women government ministers of Egypt
21st-century Egyptian women politicians
21st-century Egyptian politicians